Kerr-Patton House, also known as the S. W. Patton House, is a historic home located near Thompson, Alamance County, North Carolina. It was built about 1820, and is a two-story, frame hall-and-parlor plan, Federal style farmhouse. A rear wing was added in the late-19th century.  Also on the property are the contributing small salt house, outhouse, and the roadbed of the Great (Indian) Trading Path.

It was added to the National Register of Historic Places in 1985.

References

Houses on the National Register of Historic Places in North Carolina
Federal architecture in North Carolina
Houses completed in 1820
Houses in Alamance County, North Carolina
National Register of Historic Places in Alamance County, North Carolina